Bayan Ko (International title: The Politician / ) is a 2013 Philippine television drama series broadcast by GMA News TV. Directed by Adolfo Alix, Jr., it stars Rocco Nacino. It premiered on March 10, 2013. The series concluded on April 21, 2013 with a total of 7 episodes.

The series is streaming online on YouTube.

Premise
Lagros' newly elected mayor, Joseph Santiago, discovers that a bunch of wayward employees have turned the municipal hall into a boarding house and, worse, have been making under the table deals. His efforts to fight corruption are blocked by a political dynasty led by Governor Antonio Rubio and Congressman Anton Rubio.

Cast and characters
Lead cast
 Rocco Nacino as Joseph Santiago

Supporting cast
 Pen Medina as Antonio Rubio
 Ping Medina as Anton Rubio
 LJ Reyes as Karen Canlas
 Angeli Bayani as Nena Santiago
 Ma. Isabel Lopez as Sylvia Rubio
 Betong Sumaya as Betong
 Mercedes Cabral as Eliza Bauer
 Love Añover as Liway

Recurring cast
 Bembol Roco as Ernesto Santiago
 Cecille Adefuin as Ophie
 Simon Ibarra as the chief of police

Episodes

Accolades

References

External links
 

2013 Philippine television series debuts
2013 Philippine television series endings
Filipino-language television shows
GMA Integrated News and Public Affairs shows
GMA News TV original programming
Philippine drama television series
Philippine political television series
Television shows set in the Philippines